The Democratic Women's Association was a political organization led by Tahira Mazhar Ali in 1950. The organization was founded with the intention of including worker's rights with women's right in Pakistan. It was the first leftist organization in Pakistan that represented women's rights.

It was a grassroots movement beginning its work in small neighborhoods and involved mobilization of women and workers.

Leadership 
Tahira Mazhar Ali was the founding General Secretary for the DWA. This allowed for coalitions that helped her further her agenda in the national politics of Pakistan. 

The political organization ran with the Communist Party of Pakistan (CPP).

Core Members 
 Tahira Mazhar Ali - Founder
 Hajra Masood
 Khadija Omar
 Amatul Rehman
 Alys Faiz

References

Political organisations based in Pakistan
Women's organisations based in Pakistan
Organizations established in 1950